Vieren Station is a railway station on the Bergensbanen railway line.  The stop is located at Vieren in the northwestern corner of the municipality of Ulvik in Vestland county, Norway. The station is served by the Bergen Commuter Rail, operated by Vy Tog, with up to five daily departures in each direction. The station was opened in 1948. The surrounding area is dominantly recreational, with many cabins.

External links
 Jernbaneverket's page on Vieren

Railway stations in Ulvik
Railway stations on Bergensbanen
Railway stations opened in 1948